Anthony Gonçalves (born 6 March 1986) is a French professional footballer who plays as a midfielder for Ligue 2 club Laval.

Early life
Anthony Gonçalves was born in Chartres, the capital of the Eure-et-Loir department of France.

Career 
He made over 200 appearances in the Ligue 2 for Laval.

In June 2016, he joined Strasbourg on a two-year contract.

On 23 June 2019, he signed a three-year contract with Caen. He was named captain, replacing the departing Fayçal Fajr.

In July 2022, Anthony Gonçalves signed a new "1+1 year" contract with Laval, as the club returns to Ligue 2.

Personal life
Gonçalves is of Portuguese descent through his father.

Career statistics

References

External links
 
 Anthony Gonçalves at foot-national.com
 
 

1986 births
Living people
Sportspeople from Chartres
Association football midfielders
French footballers
French people of Portuguese descent
Stade Lavallois players
RC Strasbourg Alsace players
Stade Malherbe Caen players
Ligue 1 players
Ligue 2 players
Championnat National players
Footballers from Centre-Val de Loire